Palaiochori ("old village") is a mountain village in the municipality of North Tzoumerka in the Ioannina regional unit, northern Greece. It is built on the western slope of the Athamanika mountains, at 750 m elevation. It is on the watershed between two small rivers that flow toward the Arachthos. Its population is 66 people (2011 census). It is 4 km south of Vathypedo, 4 km northwest of Prosilio, 4 km west of Syrrako and 19 km southeast of Ioannina.

Population

History

During the Ottoman period and until 1880, Palaiochori formed a single community with current Syrrako, which fell along with other neighboring villages in the province (kaza) of Malakasi. Palaiochori was split from Syrrako in 1880 by the leader Goulas Anastasios Topalis (Goulas Tasios), despite persistent objections of the people from Syrrako who did not want the separation. The border of the two villages was formed by the ridge of Tsarkos-Priza-Plinos.  Traditionally Palaiochori is considered to be the cradle of Syrrako. The direct link is shown by the way of life, manners and customs, the dozens of place names around Syrrako and Palaiochori and the common Aromanian language. Palaiochori was liberated from the Turks in the end of 1912, when an independent section by the Cretan Regiment with the leader Trypogiorgos removed its inhabitants from the jailhouse in Trikas and moved them out even from the Papastathi bridge over the Arachthos river.

See also

List of settlements in the Ioannina regional unit

References

External links
Palaiochori Sirakou at the GTP Travel Pages

Populated places in Ioannina (regional unit)